Mess Creek is a tributary of the Stikine River, southwest of Mount Edziza in Mount Edziza Provincial Park and Recreation Area in northern British Columbia, Canada.

The creek and its tributaries have several hot springs. Mess Lake, a small body of water on Mess Creek, has warm springs. Sezill Hot Springs is on Sezill Creek.

References 

Rivers of British Columbia